Edgardo Dizon Gomez,  (November 7, 1938 – December 1, 2019) was a Filipino biologist who was conferred the rank of National Scientist of the Philippines in 2014. He was a professor emeritus for marine biology at the University of the Philippines Marine Science Institute.

Education and career 
Gomez obtained his bachelor's degree in education, major in English and Social Science (sukan cum laude) from De La Salle University, his master's degree in Biology as a Fulbright Travel Grantee from St. Mary's University of Minnesota and Ph.D. degree in Marine Biology from University of California, San Diego. He was the founding director of the Marine Science Institute at the University of the Philippines Diliman upon his return in 1973 after his doctorate studies.

Contributions 
Gomez saw the need to protect the Philippine archipelago's vast marine resources in particular that of coral reefs. He led the world’s first national-scale assessment of damage to coral reefs leading to international conservation initiatives such as the replanting of corals. He also pioneered giant clam (Tridacna gigas) breeding stationed in Bolinao and other protective areas for coastal communities of the Philippines.

Additionally, he took part in creating the baseline map of the Philippines, and provided information to the Philippine government during talks over the territorial disputes in the Spratly Islands. In 2007, he pioneered the study on ocean acidification caused by increased levels of absorbed carbon dioxide in the ocean.

Gomez was conferred the rank of National Scientist of the Philippines in 2014 by Benigno Aquino III, the President of the Philippines. This award, which comes with a lifetime pension, has been bestowed upon over thirty leading scientists. The confirmation ceremony took place at the Rizal Hall of the Malacañan Palace where Gomez was awarded for his research and conservation efforts in invertebrate biology and ecology on 12 August 2014.

Awards and recognition 
 National Scientist of the Philippines for Marine Biology in 2014
 Pew Marine Conservation Fellow in 2001
 Presidential Lingkod Bayan Awardee in 2000
 Academician by the National Academy of Science and Technology (NAST) in 1993
 The Outstanding Filipinos (TOFIL) Award for Science (Marine Biology) in 1992
 Laureate in the United Nations' Environmental Programme's (UNEP) Global 500 Roll of Honour in 1989

Personal life 
Gomez was married to career ambassador Phoebe Abaya.  They have a son, Jose Edgardo Jr.

References

External links 
Proclamation no. 843, s. 2014

1938 births
2019 deaths
Filipino biologists
De La Salle University alumni
Saint Mary's University of Minnesota alumni
University of California, San Diego alumni
Academic staff of the University of the Philippines
National Scientists of the Philippines